The Badachu (also known as "Badachu Park"), is a complex of monasteries located on the outskirts of urban Beijing, which means "Eight Great Sites" that refers to the eight Buddhist temples and nunneries scattered across the Cuiwei, Pingpo, and Lushi hills in Shijingshan District, at the foot of Beijing's Western Hills. Badachu also famous for its twelve naturally formed landscapes. As the old saying that three mountains are like a beautiful house, eight temples are like an antique in the house, and twelve scenes are like a garden outside the house.

Temples and monasteries 
 Chang'an Temple, means the temple of Eternal Peace.
 Lingguang Temple, means the temple of Divine Light.
 Sanshan Nunnery, means the nunnery of Three-hills.
 Dabei Temple, means the temple of Great Mercy.
 Longquan Nunnery, means the nunnery of Dragon Spring.
 Xiangjie Temple, means the temple of the Fragrant World.
 Baozhu Cave, means the cave of Precious Pearl.
 Zhengguo Temple, means the temple of Thoroughly Transform.

Three Mountains 
The north one is Hutou Mountain(虎头山); the south one is Qinglong Mountain(青龙山), and the middle one is Cuiwei Mountain(翠微山). The shape of the three mountains not only like a triangle but also like a road-backed armchair. Cuiwei Mountain is the backrest; Qinglong Hill and Hutou Hill are the armrests.

Cuiwei Mountains is also called Pingpo Mountain. The name of the mountain shows that the mountain's pines and cypresses are evergreens. It is the highest one among the three mountains. It famous for being burial place of Princess Cuiwei. The mountain contains five temples, which are Sanshanan Nunnery, Dabei Temple, Longquan Nunnery, Xiangjie Temple, and Baozhu cave. The mountain is the main body of Badachu Park. There is also a yellow beads hole in the mountain.

Hutou Mountain means the head of a tiger. That is because the shape of the peak of the mountain is like the head of a tiger and the whole mountain just like a lying tiger. In the historical record, the Hutou Mountain is also called Mingjue Mountain(名觉山). The mountain has two temples, which are Changan Temple and Lingguang Temple.

Qinglong Mountain means green dragon. The shape of the mountain just like a green dragon circling. The east part of it is also called Lushi Mountain. It is famous for the legend of monk Lu Shi. According to the legend, at the end of Sui Dynasty, Lu Shi tamed two dragons and buried them in the mountain. The mountain also has the ruins of four more temples and a yard. Its cultural heritage is extremely profound. The mountain has one of Eight Temple, which is Zhengguo Temple.

Twelve Scenes 

 The Top View (绝顶远眺)
 Spring Mountain with Apricot Forest (春山杏林)
 Cloud blocking the mountain peak (翠峰云断)
 Lu Shi's Evening Photo (卢师夕照)
 The Sound of Misty Rain Cuckoo (烟雨鹃声)
 After the Rain Mountain Torrent (雨后山洪)
 Water Valley Flowing Spring(水谷泉流)
 The Sunshine throughout the Tall Woods(高林晓日）
 Five Bridges Bright Moonlight(五桥夜月)
 Red Leaves in Late Autumn(深秋红叶)
 Tiger Peak Pinnacle(虎峰叠翠)
 Snow Covered the Hills(层峦晴雪)

Visiting 
Visitors can walk from one temple to another, viewing the area's scenery, arbor and rare ancient trees. Some of these trees have been standing for over six centuries, but their roots and branches are still strong and in good shape. In September and October, when the leaves are turning red, crowds of tourists come to climb the mountains. There is a cable-car to the top of the hill.

Gallery

Notes

References 

 http://www.badachu.com.cn
http://bj.bendibao.com/tour/20181115/254977.shtm
http://www.360doc.com/content/16/1115/15/31916819_606760028.shtml

External links 

 
 The Eight Great Temples in the Western Hills (Badachu)

Buddhist temples in Beijing
Parks in Beijing
Shijingshan District